Big Bang 2 is South Korean boy band Big Bang's third Japanese album. It was released on May 11, 2011.

The album was preceded by three singles: "Koe o Kikasete", "Tell Me Goodbye", and "Beautiful Hangover". "Koe o Kikasete" and "Tell Me Goodbye" managed to chart within the top five in the Japanese Oricon charts, and "Beautiful Hangover" managed to chart in the top ten.

Background and development 
Big Bang 2 is BigBang's second original Japanese album, following the release of Big Bang in 2009. The song "Ms. Liar" is a Japanese remake of their Korean song "Stupid Liar".

Singles
Prior to Big Bang 2s announcement, three singles were released. "Koe o Kikasete" was the first single and was released November 4, 2009. It charted for sixteen weeks and managed a peak position at number four. Following "Koe o Kikasete" was "Tell Me Goodbye", released June 9, 2010. "Tell Me Goodbye" achieved much the same success, managing to chart for fifteen weeks peaking at number five. "Beautiful Hangover", the third single reached number seven and charted for eight weeks. On April 18, 2011, a Japanese music video version of "Tonight" was made and uploaded on YG Entertainment's YouTube account and was released as a digital download on April 27, 2011. A fifth single, "Ms. Liar", was digitally released the same day as the album release.

Promotion
Big Bang 2 is to be accompanied by the Love & Hope Tour across Japan. The tour was previously titled the Love & Pain Tour, but it was changed due to the 2011 Tōhoku earthquake and tsunami. Part of the proceeds went to disaster relief.

Track listing

Charts

Sales and certifications

Release history

References

External links
Big Bang Official Site
Big Bang Japan Official Site
Big Bang by Universal Music Japan 

BigBang (South Korean band) albums
2011 albums
YG Entertainment albums
Universal Music Japan albums
Japanese-language albums